The National Development Initiatives Institute (NDI) is a Taiwan-based education, science and technology research organisation providing services to government, civil service and industry in the Asia Pacific region. Established in 1994, NDI is designated as an institute of higher education for civil servants by the Ministry of Education in Taiwan.

NDI did early research into adoption of testing systems to the Common European Framework of Reference for Languages the instruction of English, which the Taiwan Ministry of Education directed institutions under its supervision to adopt in June, 2005.
It is the producer of the Global English Test - a test of communicative language proficiency for students, civil servants and the general public, which it unveiled in 2007.

NDI initiated, and is part of, the International Research Fellows College, which is concerned with cooperative education, research studies, exchange students, visiting professors, professional education, academic exchange, and technological development of domestic and international universities.

References

1994 establishments in Taiwan
Educational institutions established in 1994
Education in Taipei